Cockercombe Tuff is a greenish-grey, hard pyroclastic rock, formed by the compression of volcanic ash containing high quantities of chlorite, which gives it its distinctive colour. It is found almost exclusively in the south-eastern end of the Quantock Hills near Cockercombe, Somerset, England from where it has been quarried for centuries.

Quantock Lodge is built from Cockercombe tuff.

References

Volcanic rocks
Building stone
Geology of Somerset
Volcanism of England